The Greece women's national field hockey team represents Greece in women's international field hockey and is controlled by the Hellenic Hockey Federation, the governing body for Hockey in Greece.

Greece hosted and participated in the 2013 Women's EuroHockey Championship III, where it finished in 6th and last place.

Tournament record

EuroHockey Championship III
2013 – 6th place

See also
Greece men's national field hockey team

References

National team
European women's national field hockey teams
Field hockey